Tetovo is a city in the northwestern part of North Macedonia, built on the foothills of Šar Mountain and divided by the Pena River. The city of Tetovo is the seat of Tetovo Municipality.

Tetovo was founded in the 14th century on the place of the ancient town of Oaeneon.

In the 15th c. AD, Tetovo came under Ottoman rule for about five centuries. For a short period of time during the 15th century, Tetovo came under the control of the Albanian state, League of Lezhë led by Gjergj Kastrioti Skanderbeg and the Albanians achieved a victory over the Ottomans in the Battle of Polog. After its conquest by the Ottomans, most of city's population converted to Islam and many Ottoman-style structures were built, such as the Šarena Džamija and the Arabati Baba Teḱe, which still stand as two of Macedonia's most significant landmarks of its Ottoman period. During this period, the town belonged to the Vilayet of Kosovo, became a firearm and cannon foundry, and was renamed Kalkandelen (meaning Shield Penetrator); as a result, the town attracted many workers and grew to a city. Following the World Wars, Tetovo became a part of Yugoslavia and, later, the Republic of Macedonia.

Tetovo has become the unofficial capital and centre of a predominantly ethnic Albanian region which extends in an arc from Tetovo to Struga. Over one-third of the city is inhabited by ethnic Macedonians. Tetovo historically had a large Turkish population, forming nearly one-quarter as recently as 1961, though it now makes up under 4% of the city.

South East European University, North Macedonia's third largest university after Skopje and Bitola, is located in Tetovo. Tetovo is also home to the State University of Tetovo.

Name 
In early antiquity, Tetovo was first mentioned as Oaeneum (Ωαινέον in Ancient Greek). The region was referred to as Htetovo in a Serbian Charter. During the Ottoman rule the name of the town was Kalkandelen.

History

Prehistory
There have been archaeological discoveries near Tetovo which date back to the Bronze Age (2200-1200BC). In North Macedonia, the oldest artefact, a Mycenae sword from the Bronze Age, was found outside Tetovo. It is now on show in the Museum of Macedonia in Skopje.

Early antiquity

The early inhabitants of Oaeneum were the Penestae, an Illyrian tribe that controlled the regions of Oaeneum, Draudacum (Gostivar), Uskana (Kicevo), Divra (Debar) and the main outlets towards Styberra (Prilep) in northern Pelagonia. Remote though it was, the territory of the Penestae had strategic importance. It provided one of the few passages from Illyria to Macedonia and Dardania to Macedonia via Oaeneum-Draudacum-Uskana-Styberra. In the period of 800–550 BC, the Dardani broke into Pelagonia via Tetovo and Gostivar and pushed the Phrygian Bridges there into the northern hills. It is probable that they overran Lyncus, Eordaea and Edessa. The Illyrian influence of the region has been noted in the archaeological discovery of a statue of bronzed dancer from the Illyrian period, 6th century BC.

In 171 BC, Gentius was allied with the Romans against the Macedonians, and together in 170 BC, the Romans led by Appius Claudius were on the verge of victory. However, Gentius in 169 BC changed sides and allied himself with Perseus of Macedon and led his army to a victory over the Romans in Uskana via Oaeneum. In 169 BC, Oaeneum fell into the hands of the Romans again. The Penestae were generally allied with the Romans. After the conquest of Uskana, Perseus marched his army towards Oaeneum. The location of the town was a good one, and in particular there was a pass there to the Labeatae, Gentius' kingdom. One of Perseus' men familiar with the area said there was no point in taking Oaeneum unless he controlled Draudacum.  Perseus took Draudacum with ease. However, when Perseus reached Oaeneum, it could not be taken without a full-scale assault. Its strength lay in having rather more men of military age than other places, in the fortified walls of the town, and in being enclosed on one side be a river and on the other by a mountain which was very high and difficult of access. These factors gave the townspeople some hope of resisting. Perseus invested the town and began constructing a ramp on the upper side of the city; its height would bring him up over the city walls. As soon as the ramp reached the city wall, the assault began and led to Perseus capturing Oaeneum. The town was plundered and the adult males were slaughtered.

By 168 BC, Gentius and Perseus were both defeated by the Romans and the area of Oaeneum became a part of the Roman province of Illyricum

Roman period

Oaeneum remained with in Illyricum until Diocletian's reform and Oaeneum became a part of Epirus Nova in the 4th century AD.

Due to the large barbaric incursions by the Celts, the Ostrogoths led by Theoderic the Great and the Huns from the 3rd century AD, the Romans started to build strong in-wall cities and fortresses on dominant hills around the area of Oaeneum.

Christianity spread to Oaeneum during the later period of Roman invasion and reached the region relatively early. St Paul preached the Gospel in the region. In the 2nd to the 4th centuries, the main language to spread the Christian religion was Latin. However, after the Byzantine Empire was formed from the Roman Empire, Greek was the main language used.

Middle Ages

After the strong Avaric-Slavic incursions in the late 6th century AD, all the fortresses were abandoned but not entirely demolished. Before the middle of the 9th century, the region became part of the First Bulgarian Empire. The area came under Byzantine rule again in 1018.

In the 13th and 14th centuries, Byzantine control was punctuated by periods of Bulgarian and Serbian rule. Konstantin Asen ruled as Tsar of the Bulgarian Empire from 1257 to 1277. Later the region was overrun and taken by Serbian Tsar Stefan Dušan. Between the years 1348-1353, Albanians are mentioned by Serbian Tsar Stefan Dušan as farmers and soldiers in the district of Tetovo. In 1337, Dušan restored the Monastery of St Mary (Lešok Monastery) and gifted the monastery the Albanian villages, as well as the Nanov Dol highlands. Dušan barred everyone, the Albanians included, from grazing the sheep in these highlands.

After the dissolution of the Serbian Empire, the Mrnjavčević house took the region. This did not last as the Ottomans made their way to the region.

The initial Ottoman occupation did not last as Skanderbeg and his Albanian force with aid from Tetovo, took on the Ottoman forces led by Ibrahim Pasha in the Battle of Pollog. Skanderbeg slayed Ibrahim Pasha, who was an old friend of his during his time with the Ottomans. Tetovo came under Albanian control. In August 1462, After Skanderbeg defeated Ottoman forces under Hasan bey in Mokra, Isuf bey went to move against Skanderbeg. Isuf bey marched out with 18,000 troops to Uskub. From there, he marched onto Pollog near Tetovo. Skanderbeg attacked and annihilated Isuf's force and the Pasha fled, leaving his army behind to be reduced.

Ottoman Period
 
Tetovo was founded in the early 14th century as a small medieval settlement around the Sveta Bogorodica (Holy Mother of God) church. At the end of that century, Tetovo and the surrounding area fell under the rule of the Ottoman Empire.

According to the 1455 defter records, Tetovo had an Albanian presence. Official Ottoman statistics of Nahiya Tetovo, in 1452 there were 146 Christian households and 60 Muslim, 1453 the population consists of 153 Christian and 56 Muslim families, and in 1468 – 180 Christian and 41 Muslim families, in 1545 there were 99 Christian and 101 Muslim families (38 were islamicised), in 1568 there were 108 Christian and 329 Muslim (184 islamicised).

The 1467 Ottoman defter of Tetovo attests that the Muslim neighborhood of Tetovo was inhabited by 6 heads of families with mixed anthroponyms of Islamic Albanian character, the names being Jusufi, son of Gjon; Hamza, son of Ulkos; Karagja, son of Petro; Murati, son of Domijan; Mustafa, son of Jonça and Hamza son of Mjellku. In the Christian quarter of Tetovo, alongside characteristic Slavic-Christian names, a sizeable part of the population also had anthroponyms of Christian Albanian character, with cases of Slavicisation, such as: Andreja, son of Arbanas; Lazor Shtinar with his sons Gjuro,Jorgji and Viko; Nikolla son of Gjergj; Dimitri son of Prenko; Lazor brother of Tushko, Gjon Arbanas (t.Arnaut); Dula Arbanas (t.Arnaut),Lazar  son of Tushala (compound of Tush + Shala) among others.

During the Ottoman period, the town was known as Kalkandelen, which means Shield Penetrator, in honor of the local weapon-smiths. Their superior craftsmanship extended to the advent of small firearms and cannons, which were traded all over the Balkans. The small hill above the town, near the present-day village of Lavce, has been fortified since Paeonian times and the Ottomans also built a substantial fortress there, known as the Baltepes fortress. A number of mosques were built, such as The Colored or Painted Mosque (Aladzha or Sharena Dzamija), also known as the Pasha Mosque, was built in 1459 by the Ottoman Turks; and in the 16th century, the Bektashi order also settled in Tetovo, where they remain at the Bektashi Teke. Tetovo under Ottoman tutelage became an important trade center for the local farmers and craftsmen, as well as an important military fortification. Haci Halife in the 17th century noted in his writings that Kalkandelen was expanding at an amazing rate in its lowland areas.

During the early 19th century, Abdurrahman Pasha, a prominent Albanian landowner, beautified the city of Kalkandelen, refurbishing many estates including the notable landmarks such as the Colored Mosque, the Teke and the Baltepe fortress.

In the 19th century, the Russian diplomat Ivan Jastrebov spoke highly of Kalkandelen's climate, liking the mild snowy winters, sunny and comfortably warm summers. The traveler Ami Bue described Kalkandelen as a very clean city.

By the 19th century, when the population of Kalkandelen began to increase with settlement from the surrounding villages, the French traveler Ami Boue noted that the population had reached about 4,500 people, which are Bulgarians and Albanians. The total population of the Pashalik of Kalkandelen (Tetovo) is 30,000–40,000 and consists of Bulgarians who are Eastern Orthodox and of Albanian who are Muslims.  According to British diplomat and traveller Aubrey Herbert, and English traveller Austen Henry Layard, the majority of the inhabitants of Kalkandelen were Albanian. Turkish sources cite that three-quarters of the population of Kalkandelen during the Ottoman period were Albanian. According to the statistics of the Bulgarian ethnographer Vasil Kanchov in 1900 the population of Kalkandelen consists of 8,500 Bulgarians, 9,000 Turks, 500 Arnauts and 1,200 Romani.

In the Ottoman Empire, Kalkandelen came under the Vilayet of Kosovo and was orientated towards Albanians and the Albanian struggle for independence from Ottoman rule. In 1843, the Uprising of Dervish Cara led to Albanians revolting against the Sultan due their disagreement with the Tanzimat reforms. Kalkandelen was liberated by Dervish Cara from January 1844 until September 1844, where Omar Pasha defeated the rebel forces and Kalkandelen remained within the Ottoman Empire.

During the World Wars
During the breakup of the Ottoman Empire, Tetovo came under Albanian control by forces led by Hasan Prishtina. From a period between 1913 and 1915, during the Balkan war, the Serbian Army captured Tetovo and the entire region of what is today North Macedonia became known as "South Serbia" as part of the Kingdom of Serbia.

During World War I, a rift occurred between Bulgaria and Serbia. The Bulgarian army started making way through the area and annexed Tetovo and the rest of the Macedonia region. In 1916, under the Kingdom of Bulgaria, the Bulgarian registries had recorded that Tetovo had a population of 22,000. Two-thirds of this population was listed as Albanian and one-third consisted of Bulgarian and Serbian. At the end of the war Serbia regained control of the region. Within the Kingdom of Yugoslavia, Tetovo was part of the Vardar Banovina from 1929 to 1941.

Under Royalist Yugoslavia, a crackdown on Albanians forced many from Tetovo to immigrate to the US and Canada, while thousands of Serbs were encouraged to move into the town to develop the mining and hydro-electric industries. Orthodox churches were built, skiing and pony trekking started in the Sar Mountains and White Russian settlers arrived; the town was booming.

In 1941, the Vardar Banovina ceased to exist as a result of the Axis occupation of Yugoslavia. Tetovo once again came under Albanian rule. The Balli Kombëtar ruled Tetovo with military and financial aid from the Axis powers. The Albanian national flag was raised in Tetovo, the Albanian Franc was introduced as the official currency as well as the official language and education facilities in Albanian.

Against the background of a large-scale offensive operations of the Bulgarian army aimed at Nis, Skopje and Pristina, the city was the last to be seized by the Macedonian partisans on November 19th, 1944. Several Macedonian partisan shock brigades fought for control of the city with German forces and the Balli Kombëtar. Part of the fighters were ethnic Macedonians that split from ELAS to form the First Macedonian Shock Brigade. According to Macedonian veterans from the 8th Veles Shock Brigade who participated in the fighting, the operation in Tetovo was well-planned and the enemy resistance was weakened due to the inevitability of the German defeat and the good organization and equipment of the partisans. 

After the Germans had been driven out, the communist authorities ordered the collection of weapons but this order was not well received. In Tetovo, the remaining Ballists tried to retain their control  after the Yugoslav Partisans announced victory. As result an armed uprising of massive proportions broke in the area led by the Balli Kombëtar, which aimed to resist the incorporation of the region into communist Yugoslavia. It was only in July 1945 that the Yugoslav Partisans were able to push down the uprising and re-establish their control.

SFR Yugoslavia
The town became part of the Socialist Republic of Macedonia. The early years of Socialist Yugoslavia were turbulent for Tetovo's Albanian population. Many were subjected to repression, causing many to emigrate. Those who remained demonstrated periodically but violently against the socialist Yugoslav regime, notably in the Yucel Incident of 1957 and the Kalkandelen Incident of 1968. Many of these protest were led by Mehmet Gega, a notable Albanian rights activist who was sentenced to ten years in prison. In the 1968 demonstrations, The Tetovar Albanians demanded for the attachment of the Albanian areas of Socialist Republic of Macedonia to Kosovo and their joint reconstitution as a seventh republic of Yugoslavia. The authorities rejected this demand and instead authorised the revision of syllabuses and textbooks in order to curb what it called ‘‘The penetration of Albanian nationalistic, irredentist and counter-revolutionary tendencies through printed textbooks and other literature.’’ In 1974, a new federal constitution was ratified which eased the tension of the local Albanians. The government of Yugoslavia viewed these demonstrations as the first stage in an Albanian plot aimed at eventually separating these areas, and joining them with neighboring Albania. SR Macedonia imposed harder prison sentences than the authorities in Kosovo.

Tetovo under Josip Broz Tito's Yugoslavia went through major changes. Many Yugoslav Brutalist styled apartments were built around the city centre of Tetovo as well as concrete roads. New suburbs such as the Hajdućka suburb were formed to help accommodate the rising number of Macedonians moving to the city. Some of the city's historic buildings, such as the Old Mosque, were demolished by the authorities.
 
When troubles in neighbouring Kosovo began in 1981, Tetovo had to be put under control of paramilitary police due to the rioting and show of sympathy with the Kosovar Albanians. The same happened again in 1989.

Break up of Yugoslavia

When it became obvious in 1990 that Yugoslavia was about to fall, over 2,000 ethnic Albanians marched through Tetovo demanding secession from the Socialist Republic of Macedonia and unity with Albania. Self-determination of an ethnic minority within a state was not a right under the Socialist Republic of Macedonia's constitution, and protesting their lack of representation under the constitution of a new Republic of Macedonia, the Albanians of Macedonia boycotted the referendum on independence from Yugoslavia and were thus excluded from almost any representation in the new government. Tetovo became headquarters of the new Albanian political parties, which were regarded as unconstitutional by the Republic of Macedonia. Tensions worsened, Tetovo, along with the city of Gostivar, took in and sheltered several thousands of Bosnian Muslim refugees from 1992 until the end of the Bosnian war. Prior to the NATO bombing of Serb forces in Kosovo, Tetovo became the rear supply base for the Kosovo Liberation Army, and then later home to over 100,000 Kosovar refugees from the Kosovo war. In 1997, Alajdin Demiri, the mayor of Tetovo, was jailed for raising the double headed eagle flag of Albania from Tetovo town hall, and by 2000 the outbreak of hostilities in Tanusevci had spilled into the towns of Tetovo and Gostivar. In 2001, ethnic Albanians launched an insurgency, with Tetovo being the main backdrop of the war. Fortunately, the Ohrid Agreement was established, allowing peace to return to the city again.

Present-day

In economic terms Tetovo is one of the most developing cities in North Macedonia with some multinational companies (Ecolog International, Mercure Tetovo, Renova, Kipper) being located in this town. Despite the interest of private companies in Tetovo, the city is neglected by the government. Tetovo suffers from urban sprawl. Due to the lack of government regulations, the city has no system for building permits, and many houses and buildings have been built unsafely and randomly along footpaths, roads and in parks. Air pollution levels are among the highest in Europe.

The tallest building in the city is Mercure Tetovo measuring about 80 meters in height.

Tetovo is one of the educational centres in North Macedonia hosting two universities South East European University (Public Private Non-profitable) and State University of Tetovo (Public University). The prior one has educational leadership in the region, whereat the Bologna Process is applicable since its establishment, has the best campus in the region of South East Europe and is trend with international developments in education. More than 20,000 students get their education and degrees in Tetovo.

In addition, Tetovo is a centre of ethnic Albanian politics. Most Albanian political parties on North Macedonia (Democratic Party of Albanians (DPA), Democratic Union for Integration (DUI) and the Party for Democratic Prosperity (PDP)) have their main seats there.

Tetovo has one of the highest crime rates in North Macedonia, second only to the much larger capital Skopje. The city was home to 1,229 criminal acts in the first half of 2009.

On 6 July 2014, violent protests occurred in the town where about 600 youths hurled stones Sunday at police outside the headquarters of the Democratic Union for Integration, an ethnic Albanian junior partner in parliament. The protesters were disillusioned and frustrated with their political representatives Ali Ahmeti and Menduh Thaçi and the political parties. Police dispersed the crowd by force. There was no violence reported at any other protests in the country.

On September 8, 2021, at least fourteen people were killed in an explosion at a COVID-19 center.

Culture

Tetovo has been under many different empires; from the Mycenae and Illyrians, to the Romans, Byzantines and Ottomans, giving the city a vast range of diverse cultures. Historically, Tetovo has been a nationalist center for Albanians, the more well known being Dervish Cara, Mustafa Ruhi Efendi, Tajar Tetova and Mehmet Pashë Dërralla. The museum of Tetovo, established in 1950, contains history of Tetovo and is situated in the Memorial House of Central Committee of the Communist Party of Macedonia.

Landmarks
Tetovo Municipality is home to 15 sites designated as Cultural Heritage by the Ministry of Culture, of which 14 are within the city limits of Tetovo. Nine of these are historic homes. 

The main attractions of Tetovo are its historic areas and structures. The Šarena Mosque ("The Painted Mosque") is located near the Pena River in the old part of town. The mosque was built in 1438 and rebuilt in 1833 by Abdurrahman Pasha, the son of Rexhep Pasha. It is one of the most important cultural and historical structures of Tetovo and represents the style of early Ottoman architecture. The painted mosque continues to be an important monument to the residents of Tetovo, and is the main tourist attraction for many foreign visitors. 

Sitting directly across the Pena River from the Šarena Mosque is Tetovo's Ottoman-era hamam, known as the Čifte Hamam or Bey's Hamam. It was built in the late 15th/early 16th century. Declared a monument of cultural heritage, it houses the Tetovo Art Gallery. The building was renovated between 2012 and 2015.

The Tetovo Fortress, located on the top of the Baltepe Hill, above Tetovo was built in 1820 from Abdurrahman Pasha. The Baltepes had a series of tunnels from all the main Ottoman houses in the town leading to the fortress. The thinking behind the tunnel system was to enable the defenders of the fortress to escape behind enemy lines if the fortress was besieged, allowing the besiegers themselves to be encircled. The last tunnel collapsed in the 1960s and since excavation started, two of the tunnels, to Selce and Lavce, have been found. Many local stories and myths, such as "The Tale of the Water Pump", are set at Baltepe as they focus on the three-year stay of Abdurrahman Pasha of Kalkandelen in the fortress of Baltepe, located on the "cold and dark" Shar Mountains. The old settlement of Oaeneum is believed to be located around where the fortress of Baltepe resides.

The Arabati Baba Teḱe originally built in 1538 around the türbe of Sersem Ali Baba, an Ottoman dervish. In 1799, a waqf provided by Rexhep Pasha established the current grounds of the tekke. The finest surviving Bektashi monastery in Europe, the sprawling complex features flowered lawns, prayer rooms, dining halls, lodgings and a great marble fountain inside a wooden pavilion.

The Alim Bey House is an historic estate in Tetovo. Along with the Saraj in Resen, it is among the more prominent examples of lodgings built by wealthy Ottoman pashas and beys in Macedonia that were constructed in Western-inspired architecture. The Alim Bey House is an asymmetrical estate built in the neo-Baroque style with decorated façades, ornate friezes, and the use of various geometric shapes including a hexagonal tower. The three-story home is a protected monument of cultural heritage. The building functioned as a hospital until 1993. Renovation works funded by Ministry of Culture of the Republic of Macedonia occurred in 2016.

Other notable historical features from the Ottoman period in Tetovo are The Saat Mosque ("The Clock Mosque") as the name implies it used to have a clock in its minaret, and the Kumluk Mosque ("The Sandy Mosque"), an old mosque in the upper bazaar area of Tetovo. The name is derived from the reddish-yellow exterior of the mosque.

An example of Byzantine culture outside of Tetovo Municipality is the Monastery of Lešok. In its complex are the churches of St. Athanasius of Alexandria and the Holy Mother of God Church. The Church of the Holy Virgin, built in 1326, is an excellent example of Byzantine style and architectural tradition.

Popova Šapka is a ski resort located in the Šar Mountains. Popova Šapka attracts many tourists in winter due it being one of the popular ski resorts in the former Yugoslavia. Aside from hosting recreational and competitive skiing competitions, Popova Šapka has many villas and restaurants to accommodate visitors. The rise in hotels was because the cable car that took people from Tetovo to Popova Šapka was destroyed during the 2001 Macedonia conflict. Therefore, people stay at Popova Šapka overnight before returning to Tetovo.

There are three stone bridges in Tetovo and each cross the Pena river. The bridges are some of the oldest structures in Tetovo. Most of the old heritage buildings are situated in the old town, near the centre of Tetovo. Tetovo has many old buildings and monuments however, they are endangered of being demolished by people building unpermitted buildings

Cuisine and food
Tetovo is home of the dish Tavče Gravče, known locally in Tetovo as Tavë me Groshë. During Socialist Yugoslavia, the dish was known around the country as Tetovski Gravče, in reference to the city of Tetovo, where the dish originates. Although different varieties of the meal are made around Balkans, the traditional Tetovo tavče gravče is cooked and served in a terracotta pot.

Most cuisines in Tetovo have a strong Ottoman influence or foundation such as Ajvar, Sujuk and Gevrek. Tetovo is known for its barbecue restaurants, Qebaptorë, where Ćevapi and Pljeskavica (including Shar Pljeskavica" (Šarska pljeskavica), stuffed with kashkaval cheese). Byrektorës, pastry restaurants, are also common in Tetovo and produce Burek. Ëmbëltore, sweet shops, produce locally made traditional sweets such as Lukum, Tulumba, Kataif and Baklava. Boza is also fermented in Tetovo and is a common beverage consumed.

The cuisines in Tetovo have a unique taste and flavour due to the local agricultural products used to make the cuisines. In North Macedonia, Tetovo Kashkaval cheese is the most popular as it is made naturally from sheep's milk from the Šar Mountains. During the Kingdom of Yugoslavia, apples from Tetovo were popular in Belgrade and were known as Tetovo Jabuka.

Sports
The most popular sport in Tetovo is Football. Tetovo is represented by four clubs of which three play in the Macedonian First League. FK Shkëndija, supported by the majority of the Albanians living in Tetovo. FK Renova, mainly supported by Albanians but has significant Macedonian support, and are based in Džepčište. FK Teteks is the team supported by the Macedonians living in Tetovo. FK Ljuboten is another football club based in Tetovo and is the oldest football club in North Macedonia.

FK Drita currently play in the Prva Liga, however, they are in located in the outskirts of Tetovo in a village named Bogovinje. FK Vrapčište currently plays in the Macedonian Second League, however, they are in located in the outskirts of Tetovo in the village named Vrapčište.

Wrestling, karate and volleyball are also fairly popular sports in Tetovo. Wrestling plays an important part of the sports culture in Tetovo. Highlanders from the villages of the Šar Mountains brought with them their traditional wrestling culture into the city and established wrestling clubs of the freestyle. Traditional wrestling competitions are always held once a year at Popova Šapka in the Šar Mountain during the summer. Few volleyball teams are active in the volleyball league of North Macedonia: Škendija, Bami Kor Medika, etc.)

Demographics
As of 2021, the city of Tetovo has 63,176 inhabitants and the ethnic composition was the following:

 Albanians – 41,356 (65.5%)
 Macedonians – 14,116 (22.3%)
 Persons for whom data are taken from administrative sources - 3,326 (5.3%)
 Roma – 1,877 (3.0%)
 Turks – 1,745 (2.8%)
 Serbs – 248 (0.4%)
 Bosniaks – 188 (0.3%)
 others – 290 (0.5%)

PWDTFAS-Persons for whom data are taken from administrative sources

Notable people from Tetovo

Honorary citizens
Ramush Haradinaj
Tanja Fajon
Stjepan Mesić 
Ferid Murad
Blerim Dzemaili

International relations

Twin towns – Sister cities

Tetovo is twinned with:
 Prizren, Kosovo
 Kukës, Albania
 Sterling Heights, Michigan, United States
 Konya, Turkey

Annotations

See also

Gymnasium Kiril Pejčinoviḱ
Polog Statistical Region
Tetovo Municipality

References

External links

 Komuna e Tetoves - Општина Тетово - Municipality of Tetovo
 Тајните на ТЕТОВО – 'The Secrets of Tetovo' – The most detailed page on Tetovo history
 Кирил Пејчиновиќ – web page for Kiril Pejchinovic – Tetoec
 Vratnica – A village near Tetovo
 Brief history of Tetovo

 
Cities in North Macedonia
Gegëri